HMS LST-416 was as a Landing Ship, Tank Mk.2 of the  Royal Navy during World War II.

Construction
LST-416 was laid down on 25 October 1942, under Maritime Commission (MARCOM) contract, MC hull 936, by the Bethlehem-Fairfield Shipyard, Baltimore, Maryland; launched 30 November 1942; then transferred to the United Kingdom and commissioned on 3 February 1943.

Service history 
LST-416 saw no active service in the United States Navy. She was decommissioned and returned to United States Navy custody on 12 February 1946, and struck from the Naval Vessel Register on 5 June 1946. On 23 April 1948, LST-416 was sold to the Newport News Shipbuilding & Drydock Co., Newport News, Virginia, for conversion to merchant service.

See also 
 List of United States Navy LSTs

Notes 

Citations

Bibliography 

Online resources

External links

 

Ships built in Baltimore
1942 ships
LST-1-class tank landing ships of the Royal Navy
World War II amphibious warfare vessels of the United Kingdom
S3-M2-K2 ships